The White Racial Identity Model was developed by psychologist Janet Helms in 1990. It is a racial and ethnic identity model created specifically for people who identify as white. This theory, heavily influenced by William Cross, has become a widely referenced and studied theory on white racial identity development. This model was created "to raise the awareness of white people about their role in creating and maintaining a racist society, and the need for them to act responsibly by dismantling systemic racism through a framework of power and privilege,". In addition, Helms presented the idea that all people have a racial identity in some way that is influenced by power and privilege.

Two sequential phases 
The White Racial Identity Model is broken into five stages, split into two groups: Abandonment of Racism and the Evolution of a non-racist identity. White individuals transition from understanding themselves as racial beings and the privilege associated with being white, to taking ownership of and abandoning racial privilege, and finally learning about other racial groups.

In phase one, the abandonment of racism, white-identifying individuals have no consciousness of their race and privilege until they are met with a disruption related to race. This disruption then challenges the individual's ideas of whiteness and how they play a role in a racist society. Following this encounter, the individual then begins to understand the salience of race and its relevance to power. In this stage, a person moves through three other sub-stages: Contact, Disintegration, and Reintegration. Stage one of the model is known as contact. In this stage, many individuals display color blindness because they lack an understanding of racism and have very little contact and experiences with people of color. The individual does not consider racial and cultural differences, but they also do not consider their race to be the "dominant" group. Once an individual realizes the privileges of being white by being confronted with real-life experiences of race, they may move into the next stage, disintegration. In the disintegration stage, individuals begin to challenge the notion of colorblindness through new experiences.  Furthermore, individuals are more aware of their racial identity and the privileges that come with their whiteness. Guilt or shame may also be experienced by individuals, but if these emotions are dominant, then an individual will move towards the reintegration stage. If these emotions are channeled positively then an individual can pass by the reintegration stage and move towards the pseudo-independence stage. The reintegration stage is when an individual now has a conscious belief in white superiority. In this stage, an individual perceives their race to be dominant and that all of the privileges that come with being white are deserved. 

Once an individual has experienced phase one, they move to phase two, the evolution of a non-racist identity, where they begin to reflect more seriously on their identity and how they interact with their surroundings. They begin to make more efforts to interact and learn from different racial groups. Helms wrote that people in this phase are working to "be White without also being bad, evil, or racist". The stages a person moves through in this phase includes Pseudo-independence, Immersion/Emersion, and Autonomy. The pseudo-independence stage of this model describes when an individual starts to understand white privilege and issues such as discrimination, prejudice, and bias. In this stage, an individual does not believe that white people deserve the privileges that come with being white. Individuals also support people of color and validate their experiences by supporting the efforts to combat racism. However, individuals do not understand how they can be white and non-racist at the same time. Even though they validate the experiences of people of color, they turn to people of color to confront racism instead of themselves. The following stage is the immersion/emersion stage where an individual makes an attempt to connect to their white identity and to be an anti-racist together, unlike in the previous stage. Individuals within this stage understand and connect with other white individuals with deep concern who are also addressing racism and oppression. Ultimately, whites have an increasing understanding during this stage. The final stage of the model is the autonomy stage. Within this stage, an individual has a very clear understanding of their white racial identity. Additionally, an individual within this stage is actively pursuing social justice. Individuals are very knowledgeable about racial, ethnic, and cultural differences. Individuals within this stage also value diversity and acknowledge their role in preserving racism.

Research and measurement 
The White Racial Identity Model has been measured using the White Racial Identity Attitudes Scale (WRIAS) developed originally in 1990 by Helms and Carter. Helms has said that this scale can be used to quantify the "multidimensional aspect" of the identity statues. Although this scale has been critiqued, it has been replicated in several studies and the scales in this measure are highly correlated in measuring this construct. Helms and Cook, however, recommend using qualitative analysis in conjunction with the WRIAS to develop a racial profile for these individuals.

Critiques 
One of the main critiques of this model is that it is outdated and not as applicable as it once was. The theory was created in 1990 and revised in 1995. Although it has been updated, there are many other white identity development and consciousness models that have been adapted from this that some researchers and practitioners see as more relevant. Row, Bennett, and Atkinson created their own theory in response to concerns they had with Helm's model. These critiques included the singular focus on blacks and the white-black relationship, the developmental stage focus of the model, and the similarities to ethnic identity models. They created the White Racial Consciousness Theory to address these concerns.

See also
 Acting white
 Cultural identity
 Ethnic identity development
 Identity formation
 Identity (social science)
 Racial-ethnic socialization
 White identity
 Whiteness theory

References

Further reading 
 Reason, R. D., & Evans, N. J. (n.d.). The Complicated Realities of Whiteness: From Color Blind to Racially Cognizant Color-Blind Environments.
 White Privilege: Unpacking the Invisible Knapsack" first appeared in Peace and Freedom Magazine, July/August, 1989, pp. 10–12, a publication of the Women's International League for Peace and Freedom, Philadelphia, PA. 
 Sue, D.W., & Sue, D. (2003). Counseling the culturally diverse: Theory and practice (4th ed.). New York: Wiley.

Psychological theories
Race (human categorization)
Collective identity
White culture